Ben Matthew Duckett (born 17 October 1994) is an English cricketer who plays for Nottinghamshire. He is a left-handed batsman who can play as a wicket-keeper. He made his international debut for England in October 2016.

Domestic, under 19 and national career

County cricket
Duckett made his debut for Northamptonshire in the 2012 Friends Life t20 against Gloucestershire on 8 July 2012, whilst in his first year of A-Levels at Stowe School. During the 2015 season, he scored four centuries in the County Championship, just managing to break the barrier of a thousand first-class runs in the season, with 1002 at an average of 52.73.

The 2016 season was one of conspicuous success for Duckett. He began the season with a new highest score of 282 not out against Sussex. He scored three other first-class hundreds during the season, scoring 185, 189 and 205, with a total of 1338 runs at 58.17 and played in the semi-final and final of the Twenty20 Blast for Northants. He finished on the winning side in the final, and had particular success in the semi-final, scoring 84 off just 47 balls, and sharing a 132 run partnership with Alex Wakely.

At the end of the season, Duckett was named as the young cricketer of the year by both the Cricket Writers' Club and the Professional Cricketers' Association (PCA). He was also named PCA Player of the Year, the first player to win both PCA awards in the same season.

In March 2019, Duckett scored a double century for Nottinghamshire against Cambridge MCCU during the 2019 Marylebone Cricket Club University Matches from 168 balls. It was the fastest first-class double century by a Nottinghamshire batsman, in terms of balls faced.

Under-19 career and National side
Duckett was included in the England Under-19 squad for the 2012 ICC Under-19 Cricket World Cup.

In July 2016, Duckett was selected for the England Lions squad for the series against Pakistan A and Sri Lanka A. In the first match, he scored 163 not out off just 104 balls. In the 6th match against Sri Lanka A, he scored 220* off just 131 balls during an unbeaten second wicket partnership of 367 with Daniel Bell-Drummond.

Franchise cricket
In April 2022, he was bought by the Welsh Fire for the 2022 season of The Hundred.

International career

2016 Bangladesh

Duckett was selected in the squad for the Test and ODI matches in the tour of Bangladesh. He made his England debut in the first ODI against Bangladesh. He scored 60 as England made 309 to win the game by 21 runs. He was out for a duck in the second game, which England lost. He returned to form in the final game, top scoring for England with 63 to help them chase down Bangladesh's target of 278 and win the match by four wickets to win the series 2–1.

Duckett made his Test debut against Bangladesh following his good performances in the ODI side. He scored 14 in the first innings as England scored 293 in their first innings, before making 15 in the second innings as England won by 22 runs. He made seven in the first innings of the second Test, and scored his maiden Test half-century in the second innings, scoring 56, although England lost by 108 runs.

2016 India

Duckett was selected for the tour to India though for batting at 4 with Haseeb Hameed opening. In the first Test between the two sides, he made 13 in the first innings and did not bat in the second as the match ended in a draw. In the second Test, he made five as England were dismissed for 255, and was out for a duck in the second innings as England went on to lose the match by 246 runs. He was dropped after the 2nd Test after a relatively poor series.

2017–18 Ashes tour
Duckett was deselected from the England senior team picked to face a cricket Australia XI as part the 2017-18 Ashes tour following an incident in a Perth bar. Duckett was alleged to have poured a drink over teammate James Anderson. Duckett was later suspended from playing in the final three England Lions games of the tour, and issued with a fine. He was also dropped for the 2018 England Lions tour of the West Indies on account of the incident.

2019 Pakistan
In April 2019, Duckett was added to England's Twenty20 International (T20I) squad for their one-off match against Pakistan. He made his T20I debut for England against Pakistan on 5 May 2019.

2020
On 29 May 2020, Duckett was named in a 55-man group of players to begin training ahead of international fixtures starting in England following the COVID-19 pandemic. On 9 July 2020, Duckett was included in England's 24-man squad to start training behind closed doors for the ODI series against Ireland.

2022
Duckett came into the England side on a tour of Pakistan in late 2022. He was seen as having the skill necessary for the so-called Bazball style of cricket adopted by the England team under Ben Stokes and Brendon McCullum. The decision brought immediate success with Zack Crawley and Duckett scoring the fastest ever England century opening stand (83 balls), and Crawley and Duckett scoring the fastest double-century partnership in Test cricket history (233 balls). Duckett remained in the side for the rest of the series.

References

External links
 

1994 births
Living people
English cricketers
England Test cricketers
England One Day International cricketers
England Twenty20 International cricketers
Northamptonshire cricketers
People educated at Stowe School
Islamabad United cricketers
People from Farnborough, London
North v South cricketers
Marylebone Cricket Club cricketers
Wisden Cricketers of the Year
Nottinghamshire cricketers
Nelson Mandela Bay Giants cricketers
Hobart Hurricanes cricketers
Welsh Fire cricketers
Brisbane Heat cricketers
Wicket-keepers